Idwal ap Meurig (died 997), was king of Gwynedd.

He was the son of Meurig ab Idwal Foel, who, though the rightful heir to the throne, was killed in 986, in the course of one of the many struggles for the kingship which characterised the period from the death of Hywel Dda in 950 until the time of Gruffydd ap Llywelyn. Idwal, on the death of his father, fled for safety to the collegiate establishment at Llancarfan. Maredudd ab Owain then succeeded in usurping the sovereignty of Gwynedd, and a few years after he marched on Glamorgan with an army of Danish mercenaries and laid waste the country; his object was to seize the fugitive Idwal, but in this he was unsuccessful.

By the year 995 the sons of Meurig gathered a sufficient following to return to North Wales, and, by defeating Maredudd at the battle of Llangwm, Idwal at last succeeded to the sovereignty. But the Danes had overrun the country during Maredudd's reign: the churches had been spoiled, the people were demoralised, and there was a great scarcity of food. Idwal is eulogised in the Gwentian Chronicle for his bravery and statesmanship in attempting to repair these disasters. But he was killed in 997 in attempting to expel the Danes, who, under Sweyn, the son of Harald, were once more devastating Anglesey. He left an infant son, Iago ab Idwal ap Meurig.

References

Year of birth unknown
997 deaths
Monarchs of Gwynedd
10th-century Welsh monarchs